Hollow Reed is a 1996 drama film directed by Angela Pope. The plot follows a divorced gay man who begins to suspect that his son is being physically abused by his ex-wife's new boyfriend. The story takes place in Bath, Somerset.

Plot
Oliver Wyatt lives with his mother, Hannah Wyatt, and her live-in boyfriend, Frank Donally, and spends occasional afternoons with his father Martyn Wyatt. After Oliver suffers a series of mysterious physical injuries, which he vaguely blames on neighbourhood bullies, suspicions are raised by his father, a GP, against Hannah's boyfriend, Frank.

While Martyn becomes firmly convinced Frank is abusing his son, Oliver keeps silent about the true source of his injuries, and Hannah refuses to believe Frank could be abusing her son. Martyn begins court proceedings to gain sole custody of Oliver, though his gay relationship with Tom Dixon is brought as evidence by Hannah's lawyer of the unsuitability of Martyn's home. Only after she catches Frank abusing Oliver does Hannah accept that her boyfriend is the source of Oliver's injuries, though she is swayed by Frank's pleas and agrees to remain quiet about the issue and promises Oliver that the abuse will end.

In the climactic scene, Oliver attacks Frank and is saved from a terrible beating by his father, Martyn, who instead receives Frank's wrath. As Frank's savagery is witnessed not only by Hannah, Oliver, and Tom, but also by Hannah's neighbours, who in turn call the police, the film ends with Hannah visiting Oliver, who now resides with his father, and asking him if he'd like to return to her home on occasion, now that Frank no longer lives with her. It is implied that Frank is now serving a prison sentence for abusing Oliver. Her request is met with stony silence from Oliver.

Cast
Martin Donovan as Martin Wyatt
Joely Richardson as Hannah
Sam Bould as Oliver Wyatt
Ian Hart as Tom Dixon
Jason Flemyng as Frank Donnally
Roger Lloyd-Pack as Hannah's lawyer
David Calder as Martin's lawyer
Edward Hardwicke as the judge

Reference list

External links
 

1996 drama films
1996 films
British drama films
British independent films
English-language German films
English-language Spanish films
German drama films
German independent films
Spanish drama films
Spanish independent films
Films produced by Elizabeth Karlsen
Films scored by Anne Dudley
Films about domestic violence
1997 drama films
1997 films
1990s English-language films
1990s British films
1990s German films